This is a list of notable tent cities in the United States. A tent city is an encampment or housing facility made using tents or other temporary structures.

West Coast

 Anaheim, California: Skid River
 Anchorage, Alaska: 3rd Ave and Ingra Street encampment
 Berkeley, California: Seabreeze, on and off settlement in People's Park
 Chico, California: Comanche Creek
 Eugene, Oregon: Opportunity Village, Westmoreland Park
 Eureka, California: Devil's Playground
 Fresno, California: New Jack City, Little Tijuana, Village of Hope and Community of Hope
 Hawaii: Pu'uhonua o Waianae in Waianae.
 Las Vegas, Nevada: Tent cities are prevalent in Downtown, including G Street.
 Long Beach, California: As of April 2021, one is located near Interstate 405 and 710 freeways. In September 2008, five people were shot dead at a homeless encampment near the present-day one near 405 in what is known to be one of the most deadliest acts of violence against the homeless community. In 2018, two gang members were found guilty and sentenced to life without parole. One victim was killed due to a drug disagreement; the other four witnessed the murder and were killed for this reason.
 Los Angeles and in general Los Angeles County is home to many encampments, which are heavily based in Downtown Los Angeles, Fashion District, Hollywood, Skid Row, Venice Beach, and Westlake. An estimated 40,000 homeless live in L.A. and up to 70,000 countywide. The encampments on Venice Beach started to be cleared out in late July 2021, with some tents and property of homeless residents still in process of being moved. LA Mayor Eric Garcetti signed a bill to criminalize homeless sleeping and taking up shelter in certain areas of the city; this led to riots and protests at his house with 50 protesters, and a rock was thrown at his house.

SoFi Stadium in Inglewood was center of attention in January 2022 for sweeps due to the upcoming Super Bowl 2022.
National City, California
Novato, California: Lee Gerner Park
 Oakland, California: 77th Avenue encampment, Fruitvale Home Depot encampment, The Village
 Oceanside, California: South Ocean Blvd. encampment, Roymar Road which was later replaced with rocks in May 2021
 Olympia, Washington: Camp Quixote
 Ontario, California: Temporary Homeless Service Area (THSA)
 Petaluma, California: Petaluma River encampment peaked at around 300 residents and may have some presence still.
 Portland, Oregon: Dignity Village, Right 2 Dream Too
 Rohnert Park, California: Roberts Lake encampment 
 Salinas, California: There is a tent city in Salinas’ historic Chinatown.
 San Francisco has at least 8,000 sheltered and/or homeless population, 1% of SF's population. Homeless encampments have sprouted and are more common in the areas of SoMa, Tenderloin, and have stayed in front of the San Francisco City Hall and areas throughout the city.
 San Jose, California: The Jungle was at its time one of the largest homeless encampments in the US before the spike in the homeless tent usage throughout North America in the late 2010s. In 2013, it had 175 people. Other encampments in San Jose include the one on Berryessa and McKee, which is visible from space.
 San Diego has multiple homeless camps. In March 2021, a truck driver plowed into an encampment in Downtown San Diego, killing 3 homeless men and wounding six others; the driver was arrested for manslaughter and DUI.
 Santa Barbara, California: In Isla Vista, California, which is technically separate from Santa Barbara, there are three parks with tent cities.
 Santa Cruz, California: There are about 1,200 to 1,700 homeless in Santa Cruz, 3.5% of the city; many had lived or are living in Ross Camp (200 people) and San Lorenzo Park.

 Santa Rosa, California: There is only one encampment with four or more tents/structures: located by a church and small shopping district near Sebastopol Road and South Wright Road. There was one on 4th Street in front of the Chelino's Mexican Restaurant parking lot, and on-and-off settlement on Morgan Street and Industrial Drive. Doyle Community Park, Fremont Park. Joe Rodota Trail, and Homeless Hill are defunct or have occasional settlement.
 Sacramento, California: American River encampment Tent City and Safe Ground
 Seattle: Broadview Thomas School encampment, CHAZ, The Jungle, Nickelsville, Tent City 3 and Tent City 4
 Spokane, Washington: Camp Hope is located on Washington State Department of Transportation property adjacent to Interstate 90. With a population of over 600, it the largest homeless encampment on state land in Washington.
 Woodinville, Washington: Camp Unity Eastside 
 Vallejo, California: Wilson Avenue and Sacramento Street
 Ventura, California: River Haven

Mountain and Midwest states
 Ann Arbor, Michigan: Camp Take Notice, Ann Arbor, Michigan
 Grand Rapids, Michigan: Heartside Park
 Colorado River: The Point, where the Gunnison River and Colorado River meet
 Chicago: Tent City, Uptown Tent City
 Denver: Denver has many homeless encampments that either have existed or currently exist or in same spots, including those in RiNo, and one that shut down there in November 2020 Woodstock West was one.
 Detroit: One in Hart Plaza
 Fort Wayne, Indiana: Along Saint Mary's River
 Indianapolis: Downtown Indianapolis
 Bernalillo County, New Mexico: Parts of International District
 Camp Hope, Las Cruces, New Mexico
 Minneapolis, Minnesota: 2020 Minneapolis homeless encampments on park property
 Ogden, Utah
 Salt Lake City, Utah: 600 West, and Pioneer Park has an encampment.

Southern US
 Asheville, North Carolina
 Atlanta: “The Hill”, Buckhead
 Austin, Texas banned homeless camping in April 2021. Homeless camps, as of May, exist in Austin including one on Lady Bird Trail. In May 2021, the camping ban was reinstated after a ballot proposition was approved by voters. The ban introduces potential penalties for camping, sitting, or lying down on a public sidewalk and outdoors in Downtown Austin or the area around the University of Texas campus.
 Fayette County, Tennessee: Tent City
 Greenville, South Carolina: Tent City
 Maricopa County Sheriff's Tent City, Phoenix, Arizona
 Jacksonville, Florida had a significant tent city downtown, until it was dispersed in March 2021. Smaller homeless tent cities or tents may exist in Jacksonville.
Lubbock, Texas: Avenue A and 13th Street encampment
 Norfolk, Virginia
 St. Louis, Missouri had a camp at a park near downtown which was cleared in January 2021, and homeless camps still exist in the Saint Louis area
 Pensacola, Florida
 Tampa, Florida

East coast
 Mass and Cass in Boston, Massachusetts: As of early September 2021, a tent city grew to over 100 residents from a "dozen in a matter of weeks" in the Melnea Cass Boulevard area, which is informally nicknamed "Methadone Mile".
 Camden, New Jersey: Transition Park, Camden, New Jersey
 Hartford, Connecticut: Downtown Hartford
 Tent City (100+ residents) of Lakewood, New Jersey
 New York City: One in Elmhurst, Queens as of July 2020, and Occupy City Hall They were reported in Chelsea, Manhattan and Bushwick, Brooklyn according to a 2020 NBC article. The three other boroughs reported them during this summer of 2020. There is a tent city in Bedford-Stuyvesant, Brooklyn, where a woman was protecting a friend near a tent city, where a homeless man became enraged after suspecting that the two got close to his tent, making him nervous. He then stabbed the woman, 40, who was not a resident of the tent city or believed to be homeless, to death.
Philadelphia: Kensington
Pittsburgh, Pennsylvania: In nearby Scotts Township
Washington, D.C.: Encampment under L and M Street underpasses.

Other
 St. Vincent de Paul property, Fourth Avenue North, Saint Petersburg, Florida

See also
 Skid row

References

External links
Tent Cities in America, a report from National Coalition for the Homeless
 List of tent cities at wikidot.com

Tent
Homelessness organizations
Intentional communities in the United States